Christina "Phazero" Curlee was a video game designer on Ratchet and Clank: Rift Apart at Insomniac Games. Curlee's Masters thesis was Meaningful Level Design.

Background 
Christina graduated from the University of Texas at Austin with a BFA in 2016 and the University of California Los Angeles in 2019 with a MFA. Christina collaborated on Final Flight, described as anime in a surrealist environment with the programmers wanting an '80s aesthetic.

Career 
Curlee was a 2016 International Game Developers Association Foundation Women in Games Ambassador. In 2018, Curlee's game Artifacts II – Jacaranda was featured in IndieCade. Artifacts is a game experience about childhood neglect, coping, and what it means to be an adult that has learned to live comfortably with trauma. Curlee also created Game Design... The Game (?).

In 2019 was a banner year in Christina's design career. Upon receiving a Master of Fine Arts in June, in September she joined Insomniac Games as a lead designer  for titles: Ardolis level and the Spiderbot and Glitch missions in Ratchet and Clank: Rift Apart.  In the fall of 2019, Curlee also accepted an adjunct professor position with the UCLA Department of Design and Architecture. As of 2022, Curlee continues her design work at Insomniac Games, and obtained an assistant professorship at UCLA.

References

External links 
 http://www.christinazero.com/

Women video game programmers
UCLA School of the Arts and Architecture alumni
University of Texas at Austin alumni
African-American women artists
Living people
Year of birth missing (living people)